Beaucamps-le-Jeune is a commune in the Somme department in Hauts-de-France in northern France.

Geography
The commune is situated on the D496 road, near the banks of the Bresle, the border of the departments of the Somme and Seine-Maritime.

Population

See also
Communes of the Somme department

References

Communes of Somme (department)